The Oldsmobile F-Series was built from the 1928 through 1938. The first generation continued the tradition of adding a series number for each model year; F-28, F-29, F-30 and F-31. The second generation, signified by a completely new bodystyle appearance was built from 1932 through 1938, all having been manufactured in Lansing, Michigan. 1926 saw the introduction of GM's most recognized business model, the use of common platforms shared amongst the brands, and Oldsmobile and Buick shared the GM B platform. The F-Series was shared with the Buick Master Six and was also known as the Oldsmobile Six which was introduced as a name earlier in 1913. 

The F-Series was Oldsmobile's entry-level product using the Oldsmobile straight-6 engine, and was GM's mid-priced volume leader, offered in several body styles on a common wheelbase, while the Oldsmobile L-Series, with an Oldsmobile Straight-8 engine, was the top level vehicle with a longer wheelbase. It replaced the Oldsmobile Model 30 introduced in 1923, and was replaced by the Oldsmobile Series 60 and Oldsmobile Series 70 introduced in 1938. It was exported to Japan as a knock down kit and assembled at Osaka Assembly in Osaka, Japan

First generation (F-28,F-29,F-30,F-31,F-32) 

The F-Series was equipped with a side-valve, in-line  six-cylinder engine developing 55 bhp. All four wheels now offered as standard equipment drum brakes on all four wheels. For the 1929 model year, the landaulet was replaced with the "Patrician" appearance package on the sedan. For 1931 the touring car bodystyle was cancelled permanently.

Oldsmobile had been positioned as dependable, minimal adornment, while reliable, using tested technology used in engines, suspension and driver controls in previous models. When the F-Series was introduced, twelve different body styles were offered in an array of colors using automotive lacquer by Duco (a DuPont brand product). The choices were roadsters with optional rumble seats, touring sedans, closed body coupes, sedans, with a "Deluxe" term for higher content models on closed body coupes and sedans, while the top level choice was the Deluxe Landau Sedan. Prices for 1928 started at US$925 ($ in  dollars ) for a choice of 2-door 3-passenger coupe or 2-door 4-passenger sedan to US$1,235 ($ in  dollars ) for the 4-door 5-passenger Deluxe Landau sedan. Roadsters and touring sedans had the ability to fold the windshield forward on top of the cowl for open air driving.

Starting in 1929, Oldsmobile received a senior level companion brand called Viking. Sales were compared as to which brand customers preferred as Oldsmobile was being reviewed for cancellation. Customers preferred Oldsmobile over Viking and the brand was cancelled in 1931. Chrysler took notice of the popularity of Oldsmobile products and introduced DeSoto that offered similar levels of luxury.

See also
1931 Cadillac Series 355
1928 LaSalle Series 303
1928 Buick Master Six
1928 Oakland Six Model 212 All American
1928 Pontiac Six Series 6-28
1928 Chevrolet Series AB National

Second generation (F-33,F-34,F-35,F-36,F-37,F-38)

The 1933 F-Series was introduced with an all new appearance and were equipped with a side-valve, in-line  Oldsmobile six-cylinder engine developing 74 bhp. All four wheels now offered as standard equipment hydraulic drum brakes on all four wheels, and wooden spoked wheels were permanently discontinued with pressed steel discs instead. The 1933 four-door Touring Sedan was listed at $855 ($ in  dollars ) and manufactured 5,720. 

In 1937 when the South Gate, California and Linden, New Jersey facilities were opened, 137,613 F-Series were manufactured which was affected by the Recession of 1937–1938. The Ford Motor Company began to take notice of the popularity of Oldsmobiles and introduced the De Luxe Ford as an upscale alternative which preceded the introduction of Mercury in 1938.

The options for 1937 included a single mounted spare tire in the front fender, bumper guards, a choice of AM radio with a single or twin speakers, a choice of passenger compartment heaters, a choice of clocks that were manually wound or electric, cigar lighter, seat covers, spotlight, dual windshield defroster or a electrically operated defroster with fan, wheel trim rings, wheel discs, deluxe steering wheel, luggage compartment mat, luggage compartment light, fender markers, fog lamps, insect side window screens, winter grille cover and a winter radiator shutter controlled from the instrument panel. 

For model year 1938, the F-series was split into two designations; the Series F (60) and Series G (70) and both used a six-cylinder engine. The Series G consisted of the longer wheelbase from the L-series while using the  six-cylinder engine from the F-series and was renamed the Series 70 in 1940. The 1938 F-Series four-door Touring Sedan was listed at $995 ($ in  dollars ) and manufactured 36,484.

See also
1936 Cadillac Series 60
1936 LaSalle Series 36-50
1935 Buick Special
1935 Buick Century
1935 Pontiac Six
1935 Chevrolet Master

References

Model 30
1920s cars
Vintage vehicles